La domenica specialmente (internationally released as Especially on Sunday) is a 1991 Italian comedy-drama film. It consists of four segments, all written by Tonino Guerra.  Each segment has a different director: Giuseppe Tornatore, Marco Tullio Giordana, Giuseppe Bertolucci and Francesco Barilli.

Cast

La neve sul fuoco 
Maddalena Fellini as Caterina
Chiara Caselli as the spouse
Andrea Prodan as Marco
Ivano Marescotti as Don Vincenzo
(directed by Marco Tullio Giordana)

Il cane blu 
Philippe Noiret as Amleto
Nicola Di Pinto as pastore
(directed by Giuseppe Tornatore)

La domenica specialmente 
Bruno Ganz as Vittorio
Ornella Muti as Anna
Nicoletta Braschi as Nicoletta
(directed by Giuseppe Bertolucci)

Le chiese di legno 
Jean-Hugues Anglade as Biker birds
Sergio Bini Bustric 
(directed by Francesco Barilli)

References

External links

 

1991 films
Italian anthology films
1991 comedy-drama films
Films directed by Giuseppe Tornatore
Films directed by Marco Tullio Giordana
Films scored by Ennio Morricone
Films directed by Giuseppe Bertolucci
Films directed by Francesco Barilli
Italian comedy-drama films
1990s Italian-language films
1990s Italian films